The 1st Children's and Family Emmy Awards were presented by the National Academy of Television Arts and Sciences (NATAS), to honor the best in American children's and family-oriented television programming in 2021 and 2022. The eligibility period ran from January 1, 2021, to May 31, 2022; starting the following year, the eligibility window will be from June 1 to May 31 every year. The winners were announced during two ceremoniesone focused on creative and technical arts, and the other dedicated to performances and programmingthat were held at Wilshire Ebell Theatre, Los Angeles on December 10 and 11, 2022. Dancer and media personality JoJo Siwa hosted the December 10 ceremony, while the December 11 ceremony was hosted by actor and comedian Jack McBrayer.

On November 17, 2021, the NATAS announced the creation of the Children's and Family Emmy Awards to recognize the best in children's and family television. The organization cited an "explosive growth in the quantity and quality of children’s and family programming" as justification for a dedicated ceremony. Many categories of the awards were previously presented at the Daytime Emmy Awards.

Nominations were announced on November 1, 2022, with programs The Mysterious Benedict Society and Sneakerella leading with 11 nods each. American actor and television host LeVar Burton received the inaugural Lifetime Achievement award.

Winners and nominees

The nominees were announced on November 1, 2022.

Programming
{|class=wikitable
|+ 
|-
| style="vertical-align:top;" width="50%" | 
 Sesame Street (HBO Max/PBS Kids) Helpsters (Apple TV+)
 The Not-Too-Late Show with Elmo: Game Edition (HBO Max)
 Tab Time (YouTube Originals)
 Waffles + Mochi (Netflix)
| style="vertical-align:top;" width="50%" | 
 The Baby-Sitters Club (Netflix) The Astronauts (Nickelodeon)
 Fraggle Rock: Back to the Rock (Apple TV+)
 Raising Dion (Netflix)
 Secrets of Sulphur Springs (Disney Channel)
|-
| style="vertical-align:top;" width="50%" | 
 Heartstopper (Netflix) Doogie Kameāloha, M.D. (Disney+)
 First Day (Hulu)
 High School Musical: The Musical: The Series (Disney+)
 The Mysterious Benedict Society (Disney+)
| style="vertical-align:top;" width="50%" | 
 Sneakerella (Disney+) Better Nate Than Ever (Disney+)
 Muppets Haunted Mansion (Disney+)
 See Us Coming Together: A Sesame Street Special (HBO Max)
 Spin (Disney Channel)
 Waffles + Mochi's Holiday Feast (Netflix)
|-
| style="vertical-align:top;" width="50%" | 
 Who Are You, Charlie Brown? (Apple TV+) Hi I'm Sevy (Magnolia Network)
 Kids Baking Championship (Food Network)
 Nick News (Nickelodeon)
 Sesame Street in Communities: Talking About Race (YouTube.com)
| style="vertical-align:top;" width="50%" | 
 Ada Twist, Scientist (Netflix) Molly of Denali (PBS)
 Octonauts: Above & Beyond (Netflix)
 Santiago of the Seas (Nickelodeon)
 Xavier Riddle and the Secret Museum (PBS)
|-
| style="vertical-align:top;" width="50%" | 
 City of Ghosts (Netflix) The Cuphead Show! (Netflix)
 The Proud Family: Louder and Prouder (Disney+)
 Star Trek: Prodigy (Paramount+)
 A Tale Dark & Grimm (Netflix)
| style="vertical-align:top;" width="50%" | 
 Hilda and the Mountain King (Netflix) El Deafo (Apple TV+)
 Hotel Transylvania: Transformania (Amazon Prime Video)
 Maya and the Three (Netflix)
 Trollhunters: Rise of the Titans (Netflix)
|-
| style="vertical-align:top;" width="50%" | 
 We the People (Netflix) Ciao Alberto (Disney+)
 Little Bird (Vimeo)
 Rhymes Through Times (Noggin)
 Sesame Street in Communities: Explaining Race | #ComingTogether (YouTube.com)
| style="vertical-align:top;" width="50%" | 
 Madrid Noir (Oculus TV) Cat Burglar (Netflix)
 In Space with Markiplier (YouTube Originals)
 Namoo (Baobab Studios)
 Paper Birds (Oculus TV)
|-
| colspan="2" style="vertical-align:top;" width="50%" | 
 Maya and the Three (Netflix) CHOOSE KINDNESS Campaign (ABC)
 Dragons: The Nine Realms (Hulu and Peacock)
 Jurassic World: Camp Cretaceous (Netflix)
 My Squishy Little Dumplings (Nickelodeon)
 PBS KIDS: "You Taught Me" Brand Campaign (PBS)
|-
|}

Performer

Art Direction
{|class=wikitable
|+ 
|-
| style="vertical-align:top;" width="50%" | 
 Fraggle Rock: Back to the Rock – Tyler Bishop Harron, Brentan Harron, Bill Ives, Evan Spence, Paul Healy, Alan McCullagh, Ian Nothnagel (Apple TV+) Muppets Haunted Mansion – Darcy Prevost, Kathryn Molenaar, Mark D. Allen, Jeanine Ringer (Disney+) The Barbarian and the Troll – Matthew Budgeon, Gary Kordan, John Alvarez, Tricia Robertson, Kelsey Fowler, David Manske (Nickelodeon)
 Sneakerella – Elisa Suave (Disney+)
 The Mysterious Benedict Society – Michael Wylie, Marshall McMahen, Ide Foyle (Disney+)
|-
|}

Casting
{|class=wikitable
|+ 
|-
| style="vertical-align:top;" width="50%" | 
 Heartstopper – Daniel Edwards (Netflix) Better Nate Than Ever – Patrick Goodwin, Bethany Knox, Bernie Telsey (Disney+)
 Doogie Kameāloha, M.D. – Leslie Woo (Disney+)
 Muppets Haunted Mansion – Tony Shepherd, Anne McGinnis (Disney+)
 Sweet Tooth – Carmen Cuba, Stu Turner (Netflix)
| style="vertical-align:top;" width="50%" | 
 The Proud Family: Louder and Prouder – Tatiana Bull, Aaron Drown, David H. Wright III (Disney+) Big Nate – Roxanne Escatel, Amanda Goodbread, Amy Zeis (Paramount+)
 Centaurworld – Linda Lamontagne (Netflix)
 Go! Go! Cory Carson – Kim Donovan (Netflix)
 Monsters at Work – Aaron Drown, Colleen Nuño-O’Donnell, Julia Pleasants, David H. Wright III (Disney+)
|-
|}

Animation
{|class=wikitable
|-
| colspan="2" style="vertical-align:top;" width="50%" | 
 The Cuphead Show! – Ivan Aguirre (Netflix) Kid Cosmic – Craig McCracken (Netflix) Kid Cosmic – Chris Tsirgiotis (Netflix) Maya and the Three – Alex Konstad (Netflix) Monsters at Work – Ron Tolentino Velasco (Disney+) SpongeBob SquarePants: "SpongeBob's Road to Christmas" – Benjamin Arcand (Nickelodeon) Star Trek: Prodigy – Alessandro Taini (Paramount+)|-
|}

Cinematography and Lighting
{|class=wikitable
|+ 
|-
| style="vertical-align:top;" width="50%" | 
 Better Nate Than Ever – Declan Quinn (Disney+) Fraggle Rock: Back to the Rock – Gavin Smith, Kirk Chiswell, Tim Milligan (Apple TV+)
 The Mysterious Benedict Society – Francois Dagenais (Disney+)
 Sneakerella – Matthew Sakatani Roe (Disney+)
 Waffles + Mochi – Christopher Gill, Jeremy Leach, John Tanzer (Netflix)
| style="vertical-align:top;" width="50%" | 
 Punky Brewster – Joe Pennella, Vance Brandon, Jack Chisholm, Eli Franks, Bob McCall, Bruce Pasternack (Peacock) Bunk'd – Gary Scott (Disney Channel)
 Family Reunion – John Simmons (Netflix)
 Just Roll with It – Joseph Wilmond Calloway (Disney Channel)
 Raven's Home – Bryan Hays (Disney+)
|-
| colspan="2" style="vertical-align:top;" width="50%" | 
 Harry Potter: Hogwarts Tournament of Houses – Simon Miles (Cartoon Network/TBS) Donkey Hodie – Joel K. Flory, Mark Kluiszo (PBS)
 Endlings – George Lajtai (Hulu)
 High School Musical: The Musical: The Series – Chris Reiter (Disney+)
 Sesame Street – Dan Kelley (HBO Max)
|-
|}

Choreography and Stunts
{|class=wikitable
|+ 
|-
| style="vertical-align:top;" width="50%" | 
 Sneakerella – Emilio Dosal (Disney+) Better Nate Than Ever – Zach Woodlee (Disney+)
 The Fairly OddParents: Fairly Odder – Cynthia Nowak (Paramount+)
 High School Musical: The Musical: The Series – Zach Woodlee (Disney+)
 The J Team – Heather Laura Gray (Paramount+)
 Siwas Dance Pop Revolution – Jojo Siwa (Peacock)
| style="vertical-align:top;" width="50%" | 
 Danger Force'' – Vince Deadrick Jr. (Nickelodeon)
 Endlings – Larissa Stadnichuk (Hulu)
 The Fairly OddParents: Fairly Odder – Brian Williams (Paramount+)
 Raising Dion – Jennifer Badger (Netflix)
 Side Hustle – William Wong (Nickelodeon)
|-
|}

Costumes, Makeup and Hairstyling
{|class=wikitable
|+ 
|-
| style="vertical-align:top;" width="50%" | 
 'The Mysterious Benedict Society – Catherine Adair (Disney+) High School Musical: The Musical: The Series – Maria Aguilar (Disney+)
 Odd Squad – Christine Toye (PBS)
 Raven's Home – Nancy Butts Martin, Carla Accardi Terner (Disney+)
 Sneakerella – Rachael Grubbs (Disney+)
| style="vertical-align:top;" width="50%" | 
 The Canterville Ghost – Paul Boyce, Helen Smith, Faye Adin (BYUtv) The Baby-Sitters Club – Florencia Cepeda, Ceilidh Dunn (Netflix)
 The Fairly OddParents: Fairly Odder – Joe Matke, Roma Goddard, Yunea Cruz, Danyell Weinberg, Michael Johnston, Julie Hassett, Gerardo Avila, Tyson Fountaine (Paramount+)
 Heartstopper – Diandra Ferreira, Sorcha Fisher, Melanie Lindsay (Netflix)
 High School Musical: The Musical: The Series – Shanda Palmer, Heidi Seeholzer (Disney+)
 Sneakerella – Brian Hui, Jen Fisher (Disney+)
 Warped! – Wendy J. Weiss, Erin B. Guth, Ashlyn R. McIntyre, Jeanette Jani Kleinbard, Tiphanie G. Baum, Myesha M. Starks, Janice J. Zoladz-Allison (Nickelodeon)
|-
|}

Directing
{|class=wikitable
|+ 
|-
| style="vertical-align:top;" width="50%" | 
 The Mysterious Benedict Society – Greg Beeman, James Bobin, Shannon Kohli, Karyn Kusama, Wendey Stanzler, Mark Tonderai, Glen Winter (Disney+) The Baby-Sitters Club – Kimmy Gatewood, Robert Luketic (Netflix)
 Sneakerella – Elizabeth Allen Rosenbaum (Disney+)
 Spin – Manjari Makijany (Disney Channel)
 Sweet Tooth – Toa Fraser, Robyn Grace, Jim Mickle, Alexis Ostrander (Netflix)
 Who Are You, Charlie Brown? – Michael Bonfiglio (Apple TV+)
| style="vertical-align:top;" width="50%" | 
 The Quest – Jack Cannon, Harold Cronk, Elise Doganieri, Bertram van Munster (Disney+) Raven's Home – Raven-Symoné (Disney+)
 Sesame Street – Marilyn Agrelo, Ken Diego, Richard Fernandes, Shannon Flynn, Kimmy Gatewood, Todd E. James, Jack Jameson, Benjamin Lehmann, Julie LoRusso, Linda Mendoza, Alan Muraoka, Liliana Olszewski, Scott Preston, Chuck Vinson, Matt Vogel (HBO Max)
 Top Chef Family Style – Shanra Kehl (Peacock)
 Zero Chill – Angelo Abela (Netflix)
|-
| style="vertical-align:top;" width="50%" | 
 Stillwater – Jun Falkenstein, Roy Burdine, Gary Hartle, Amber Tornquist Hollinger (Apple TV+) Ada Twist, Scientist – Jean Herlihy, Alan Moran, Seamus O'Toole, Amnon Schwarz, Shobhit Trivedi (Netflix)
 Daniel Tiger's Neighborhood – Tammy Langton, Ricardo Silva (PBS)
 Go! Go! Cory Carson – Adam Campbell, Jason Heaton, Vlad Kooperman, Uri Lotan, Stanley Moore, Alex Woo, François Perreau (Netflix)
 Muppet Babies – Jeremy Jensen, Guy Moore, Matt Danner (Disney Junior)
 Storybots: Learn to Read – Colin Lepper (Netflix)
| style="vertical-align:top;" width="50%" | 
 City of Ghosts – Ako Castuera, Luis Grane, Elizabeth Ito, Bob Logan, Pendleton Ward (Netflix) Arlo the Alligator Boy – Ryan Crego (Netflix)
 Carmen Sandiego – Jos Humphrey, Mike West, Flavia Guttler (Netflix)
 Ciao Alberto – McKenna Harris (Disney+)
 Dug Days – Bob Peterson (Disney+)
 Hilda and the Mountain King – Andy Coyle, Megan Ferguson (Netflix)
|-
| colspan="2" style="vertical-align:top;" width="50%" | 
 Centaurworld: Seasons 1–2 – Kristi Reed (Netflix) Amphibia – Eden Riegel (Disney Channel)
 Hilda and the Mountain King – David Peacock (Netflix)
 The Proud Family: Louder and Prouder: Season 1 – Ralph Farquhar, Bruce Smith (Disney+)
 Summer Camp Island: Seasons 4–5 – Kristi Reed (HBO Max)
|-
|}

Editing
{|class=wikitable
|+ 
|-
| style="vertical-align:top;" width="50%" | 
 Sneakerella – Ishai Setton (Disney+) Fraggle Rock: Back to the Rock – Duncan Christie, Marianna Khoury, Paul Winestock (Apple TV+)
 Sweet Tooth – Michael Berenbaum, Shawn Paper (Netflix)
 The Mysterious Benedict Society – David E.K. Abramson (Disney+)
 Who Are You, Charlie Brown? – Mikayla Irle, Tim K. Smith (Apple TV+)
| style="vertical-align:top;" width="50%" | 
 Making Fun – Patrick Berry, Brady Haley, Brett McVicker, Jesse Soff, Bryn Vytlacil (Netflix) The Not-Too-Late Show with Elmo: Game Edition – Joseph DiGiacomo, Todd E. James, Fritz Archer, Ed Kulzer, Scott Owsley, Jordan Santora (HBO Max)
 Sesame Street – Joseph DiGiacomo, Todd E. James, Memo Salazar, William D'Amico, Ed Kulzer, Scott Owsley, Chris Reinhart, Jordan Santora, Rich Woolf Jr. (HBO Max)
 The Quest – Derek Esposito, Rob Chandler, Lindsay Ragone (Disney+)
 Top Chef Family Style – Steve Lichtenstein, Ericka Concha, Timothy Daniel, Chris King, Eric Lambert, Matthew Moul, Matt Reynolds, Anthony Rivard, Jay M. Rogers, Daniel Ruiz, Reggie Spangler (Peacock)
|-
| style="vertical-align:top;" width="50%" | 
 Trash Truck – Sally Bergom (Netflix) Beepers – Paal Rui, Billy Kostka, Zen Rosenthal (Cartoon Network)
 Go! Go! Cory Carson – T.M. Christopher, Greg Knowles (Netflix)
 Octonauts & the Ring of Fire – Tanner Adams, Marc Andre-Monten, Chris Avery, Chris Holmes (Netflix)
 Stillwater – Jill Calhoun, Jack Paulson (Apple TV+)
| style="vertical-align:top;" width="50%" | 
 Ciao Alberto – Jennifer Jew (Disney+) Dug Days – Torbin Xan Bullock (Disney+)
 Maya and the Three – Myra Lopez (Netflix)
 Monsters at Work – Christopher Gee, Dan Molina, Jhoanne Reyes, Shawn Lemonnier (Disney+)
 Olaf Presents – Jeff Draheim (Disney+)
|-
|}

Main Title and Graphics
{|class=wikitable
|+ 
|-
| style="vertical-align:top;" width="50%" | 
 Hilda and the Mountain King – Melissa Buisain, Jay Grandin, Conor Whelan, Eric Pautz (Netflix) Big Nate – David Skelly, Sam Koji Hale, Jim Mortensen, Dennis Shelby, Vicki Scott (Paramount+)
 The Ghost and Molly McGee – Steve Loter, Dave Knott, Steve Loter, Tony Molina, Noel Belknap (Disney Channel)
 Green Eggs and Ham – Xanthe Bouma, Efrain Farias, Monica Grue, Jasmin Lai, Elaine Lee, Claire Nero, Jojo Park, Lauren Zurcher, Kevin Dart, Maria Torregrosa Domenech, Matt Herring, Tommy Rodricks, Jong-Ha Yoon (Netflix)
 The Mysterious Benedict Society – Aaron Bjork, Michael Riley, Bob Swensen, Penelope Nederlander (Disney+)
|-
|}

Music
{|class=wikitable
|+ 
|-
| style="vertical-align:top;" width="50%" | 
 Sneakerella – Elvin Ross (Disney+) Better Nate Than Ever – Gabriel Mann (Disney+)
 The J Team – Luke Eisner, Jeannie Lurie, Gabriel Mann, Gus Ross, JoJo Siwa, Matthew Tishler, Andrew Underberg (Paramount+)
 The Mysterious Benedict Society – Theodore Shapiro, Joseph Shirley (Disney+)
 Ruby and the Well – Lora Bidner, Robert Carli (BYUtv)
| style="vertical-align:top;" width="50%" | 
 Cat Burglar – Christopher Willis (Netflix) Looney Tunes Cartoons – Carl Johnson, Joshua Moshier (HBO/HBO Max)
 Snoopy Presents: To Mom (and Dad), With Love – Jeff Morrow (Apple TV+)
 The Tom & Jerry Show – Vivek Maddala, Steven Morrell (Boomerang)
 The Wonderful World of Mickey Mouse – Chris Willis (Disney+)
|-
| colspan="2" style="vertical-align:top;" width="50%" | 
 Sesame Street: "Friends with a Penguin" – Kathryn Raio-Rende, JP Rende, Ken Scarborough (HBO Max) Fancy Nancy: "If You Have a Dream" – Philip Bentley, Matthew Tishler, Andy Guerdat (Disney Junior)
 Sneakerella: "In Your Shoes" – William Behlendorf, Jason Mater, Brandon Rogers (Disney+)
 Sneakerella: "Kicks" – Antonina Armato, Tim James Price, Adam Schmalholz, Thomas Armato Sturges (Disney+)
 It's The Small Things, Charlie Brown: "It's The Small Things, Charlie Brown" – Ben Folds (Apple TV+)
|-
|}

Sound
{|class=wikitable
|+ 
|-
| style="vertical-align:top;" width="50%" | 
 Sweet Tooth – George Haddad, Chad J. Hughes, Alexander Pugh, Alex Gruzdev, Sean Hessinger, Julie Altus, Mark Messenger, Mark Williams, Brad Sherman, John Sanacore, Catherine Harper, Rick Owens, Scott Francisco (Netflix) The Astronauts – Greg Hewett, Dean Giammarco, Bill Sheppard, Julia Graff, Aaron Olson, Maureen Murphy, Pat Haskill, Gord Hillier, David Chen, Gord Sproule (Nickelodeon)
 Raising Dion – Michael Wynne, Patrick Cyccone, Jr., Scott Weber, Daniel Pagán, Jessica Harrison, Andrea Horta, Mason Kopeikin, Bob Costanza, Natalia Lubowiecka, Jacek Wiśniewski (Netflix)
 Scaredy Cats – Humberto Corte, Brody Ratsoy, Miguel Araujo, Alex Lara, Chris Fairfield, Iain Pattison, Nick Wright (Netflix)
 The Mysterious Benedict Society – Ian Tarasoff (Disney+)
| style="vertical-align:top;" width="50%" | 
 Octonauts & the Ring of Fire – Ewan Deane, Jamie Mahaffey, Iain Pattison, J. Martin Taylor, Nolan McNaughton (Netflix) City of Ghosts – Nick Gotten, Tony Orozco (Netflix)
 Go! Go! Cory Carson – Max Serwitz, Alex Wilmer, Frank Chung Fan Liu, Yeonhee Bae, Rain Yu Gu, Jonah Perry, Sae Wilmer (Netflix)
 Mecha Builders – Christopher Harris, Brandon Atabales-Schnitzler, Stephen Mullett, Earl Torno (HBO Max)
 Octonauts: Above & Beyond – Jamie Mahaffey, J. Martin Taylor (Netflix)
|-
| colspan="2" style="vertical-align:top;" width="50%" | 
 Maya and the Three – Jack Cucci, Tavish Grade, Andres Locsey, David Barbee, Masanobu "Tomi" Tomita, John Cucci, Dan O'Connell, Scott Martin Gershin, Chris Richardson, Andrew Vernon (Netflix) Ciao Alberto – Liz Marston, André Fenley, Nicholas Docter (Disney+)
 Hotel Transylvania: Transformania – Tateum Kohut, Will Files, Nerses Gezalyan, Nerseh Gezalyan, Katie Halliday, Dominick Certo, Curt Schulkey, James Morioka, Matt Cavanaugh, Justin Davey, Diego Perez, Ryan Sullivan, Greg Ten Bosch, Matt Yocum, Gouen Everett, Robin Harlan, Sarah Monat (Amazon Prime Video)
 Lego Star Wars: Terrifying Tales – Bonnie Wild, David Collins, Matthew Wood (Disney+)
 Trollhunters: Rise of the Titans – Carlos Sanches, Aran Tanchum, Otis Van Osten, Matt Hall, James Miller, Jason Oliver, Tommy Sarioglou, Vincent Guisetti (Netflix)
|-
|}

Visual and Special Effects
{|class=wikitable
|+ 
|-
| style="vertical-align:top;" width="50%" | 
 Endlings – Matthew J.R. Bishop, Terry Bradley, Cody McCaig, Daryl Shail, Teodora Ilie, Yulia Kopyttseva, Luba Kukharenko, Alyssa Schmidt (Hulu) The Mysterious Benedict Society – Moika Sabourin, Philippe Thibault, Marie-Pierre Boucher, Roberto Lobel, Jeremy Lambolez (Disney+)
 Raising Dion – To be determined (Netflix)
 Sweet Tooth – Matt Bramante, Rob Price (Netflix)
 Waffles + Mochi – Alex Popkin, David Lebensfeld, Grant Miller, Evan Davies, Rachel Hanson, Matthew Poliquin, Chad Sigston, Claudia Dillard (Netflix)
| style="vertical-align:top;" width="50%" | 
 The Quest – Mike Elizalde, Alan J. Gonzalez Ramirez, Rose Labarre, Tim Peters, Johnny Wujek, Sarah Dixey, Erica Adams, Alyn Topper, Lauren McKeever, Jennifer Tremont, Elle Favorule, Michelle Sfarzo, Sonia Caberera, Nancy Leonardi (Disney+) Danger Force – Kristin Dangl, Katie Gavin Elford, Tricia Bercsi Wilkin, Dina Dominguez, Jesse Hyatt, Brandy Lusvardi, Joe Matke, Roma Goddard, Yunea Cruz, Danyell Weinberg, Michael Johnston, Brad Look, Kevin Westmore, Tyson Fountaine, Ron Pipes (Nickelodeon)
 Muppets Haunted Mansion – Lisa Davis, Rebecca Graves, Donna May, Sean Smith, Renee Vaca, Elle Favorule, Sonia Cabrera (Disney+)
 Odd Squad – Christine Toye, Erica Croft, Jessica Panetta, Rhonda Stone, Samantha Couture, Katie Minnis (PBS)
 Sweet Tooth – Justin Raleigh (Netflix)
|-
|}

Writing
{|class=wikitable
|+ 
|-
| style="vertical-align:top;" width="50%" | 
 The Baby-Sitters Club – Lisha Brooks, Rheeqrheeq Chainey, Ryan O'Connell, Dan Robert, Sascha Rothchild, Rachel Shukert (Netflix) See Us Coming Together: A Sesame Street Special – Ken Scarborough, Liz Hara (HBO Max)
 Sesame Street – Ken Scarborough, Harron Atkins, Molly Boylan, Laura Canty-Samuel, Jennifer Capra, Jessica Carleton, Geri Cole, Joseph Fallon, Christine Ferraro, Michael Goldberg, Monique D. Hall, Liz Hara, Ron Holsey, Raye Lankford, Wendy Marston, Tim McKeon, Andrew Moriarty, Luis Santeiro, Pilot Viruet, Morgan von Ancken, Belinda Ward, Autumn Zitani, Moujan Zolfaghari (HBO Max)
 Waffles + Mochi – Ann Austen, Shaun Diston, Cirocco Dunlap, Jeremy Konner, Lyric Lewis, David Radcliff (Netflix)
 Who Are You, Charlie Brown? – Michael Bonfiglio, Marcella Steingart (Apple TV+)
| style="vertical-align:top;" width="50%" | 
 Heartstopper – Alice Oseman (Netflix) Better Nate Than Ever – Tim Federle (Disney+)
 Doogie Kameāloha, M.D. – Kourtney Kang (Disney+)
 The Mysterious Benedict Society – Phil Hay, Matt Manfredi (Disney+)
 Sweet Tooth – Justin Boyd, Noah Griffith, Christina Ham, Haley Harris, Jim Mickle, Michael R. Perry, Beth Schwartz, Daniel Stewart (Netflix)
|-
| style="vertical-align:top;" width="50%" | 
 Muppet Babies – Max Beaudry, Robyn Brown, Hanah Lee Cook, Sarah Eisenberg, Ghia Godfree, Francisco Paredes, Becky Wangberg (Disney Junior) Ada Twist, Scientist – Chris Nee, Kerri Grant, Ivory Floyd, Jennifer Hamburg, Lisa Kettle, Gabrielle Meyer, Robert Vargas, Aydrea Walden (Netflix)
 Alma's Way – Jorge Aguirre, Ami Boghani, Ernie Bustamante, Rosemary Contreras, Isabel Galupo, Ashley Griffis, Monique D. Hall, Melinda LaRose, Kris Marvin Hughes, Paul Moncrieffe, Miklos Perlus, Utkarsh Rajawat, Michael Rodriguez, Sheila Rogerson, Rodney Stringfellow, Bernice Vanderlaan, Dana Chan (PBS)
 Daniel Tiger's Neighborhood – Angela C. Santomero, Jill Cozza-Turner, Becky Friedman, Stacey Greenberger, Monique D. Hall, Jennifer Hamburg, Mary Jacobson, Melinda LaRose, Alyson Piekarsky, Alexandra Cassel Schwartz (PBS)
 Molly of Denali – Peter Hirsch, Princess Daazhraii Johnson, Aaluk Edwardson, Peter Ferland, Anna Hoover, Frank Henry Kaash Katasse, Elana Lesser, Cliff Ruby, Vera Starbard, June Thiele, X’unei Lance Twitchell, Kathy Waugh, Wáats'Asdíyei (Joe) Yates (PBS)
| style="vertical-align:top;" width="50%" | 
 Maya and the Three – Jeff Ranjo, Tim Yoon, Jorge Gutierrez, Candie Langdale, Doug Langdale, Silvia Olivas (Netflix) Amphibia – Matt Braly, Michele Cavin, Adam Colás, Jack Ferraiolo, Todd McClintock, Jenava Mie, Gloria Shen (Disney Channel)
 City of Ghosts – Ako Castuera, Luis Grane, Elizabeth Ito, Bob Logan, Joanne Shen, Pendleton Ward (Netflix)
 Dug Days – Bob Peterson (Disney+)
 Karma's World – Halcyon Person, Erica Eastrich, Lakna Edilima, Kerri Grant, Kellie R. Grffin, Emma Kassirer, Jehan Madhani, Alison McDonald, Charity L. Miller, Alyson Piekarsky, Darnell Lamont Walker, Keion Jackson (Netflix)

|-
|}

Lifetime Achievement Award
 LeVar Burton'''

Presenters and performers
The following will be presenting awards and performing numbers:

Shows with multiple nominations

References

External links
 Children's and Family Emmys website

Children's and Family Emmy Awards
Children's and Family Emmy Awards
Emmy Awards
2022 awards in the United States
Children's and Family Emmy Awards
Emmy Award ceremonies
Children's and Family Emmy Awards